Christopher Duberet (born 28 April 1994) is a Greek professional footballer. He plays as a centre back for AO Karava. He was born in Athens to Congolese parents.

External links
 
 

1994 births
Living people
Footballers from Athens
Greek footballers
Citizens of the Democratic Republic of the Congo through descent
Democratic Republic of the Congo footballers
Greek people of Democratic Republic of the Congo descent
AEK Athens F.C. players
Association football defenders
Greek expatriate sportspeople in Germany
Greek expatriate footballers
Expatriate footballers in Germany
Inter Leipzig players